Jill Annette Hall (born 1947), is a female former athlete who competed for England.

Athletics career
Hall was selected by England to represent her country in athletics events.

She represented England and won a silver medal in the 4 x 110 yards relay and a bronze medal in the 100 yards, at the 1966 British Empire and Commonwealth Games in Kingston, Jamaica.

She was a member of the Mitcham Athletics Club and reached the final of the 1966 European Athletics Championships.

References

1947 births
Living people
English female sprinters
Commonwealth Games medallists in athletics
Commonwealth Games silver medallists for England
Commonwealth Games bronze medallists for England
Athletes (track and field) at the 1966 British Empire and Commonwealth Games
Medallists at the 1966 British Empire and Commonwealth Games